The Dease Plateau is a sub-plateau of the larger Yukon Plateau, and is located in far northern British Columbia, Canada, northwest from the Deadwood River to and beyond the Yukon-British Columbia boundary.  The plateau is named in association with Dease Lake and the Dease River.  Very mountainous in some of its vast area, it is in some classification systems it is included as a subarea of the Cassiar Mountains.

Subranges
Horseranch Range

References

Plateaus of British Columbia
Cassiar Mountains
Liard Country